Sean Linkenback is an attorney and author known for writing the Unauthorized Guide to Godzilla Collectibles, the first comprehensive guide on the subject in the English language.  Before that he was an adviser to Warren's Movie Poster Price Guide, the Overstreet Comic Book Price Guide, as well as being an adviser on the first Sotheby's comic book auction, and a frequent writer about comics including the feature "CBM Presents Sleepers" in Comic Book Marketplace. Currently he works as an attorney in Atlanta, Georgia as well as being an infrequent columnist for the magazine Movie Collector's World.

In 2014, Linkenback released The Art of Japanese Monsters, a comprehensive guide to worldwide movie poster artwork from Japanese science fiction and horror (kaiju) films of the past 60 years. It especially focused on the Godzilla and Gamera series of films produced by Toho Films and Daiei Film respectively.
This book is available as both a regular hardbound edition and a limited leatherbound edition of 100 copies that was signed by Godzilla series star Akira Takarada and suit actor Haruo Nakajima.

References

Collecting Movie Posters To Godzilla
Scoop Interview
Michigan State Library
George Sean Linkenback at IMDB

Georgia State University alumni
Year of birth missing (living people)
Living people